Colobothea punctata is a species of beetle in the family Cerambycidae. It was described by Per Olof Christopher Aurivillius in 1902. It is known from Colombia and Peru.

References

punctata
Beetles described in 1902